Depot Creek is a river in Frontenac County and Lennox and Addington County in Eastern Ontario, Canada. It is in the Great Lakes Basin and is a left tributary of the Napanee River.

Course
The creek begins at Sixth Depot Lake in Stone Mills, Lennox and Addington County, and flows northeast into Central Frontenac, Frontenac County and to Fifth Depot Lake, then turns southeast to Fourth Depot Lake, turns south, is crossed by the Canadian Pacific Railway main line and reaches Third Depot Lake. It exits Third Depot Lake controlled by a dam, heads southeast to Second Depot Lake, exits that lake controlled by a dam, continues southeast into South Frontenac and to First Depot Lake, heads south, flows through the community of Bellrock, and reaches its mouth at the Napanee River. The Napanee River flows to the Bay of Quinte on Lake Ontario.

See also
List of Ontario rivers

References

Sources

Rivers of Frontenac County
Rivers of Lennox and Addington County